The Kennedy School, originally the John D. Kennedy Elementary School, is a former elementary school that has been converted to a hotel, movie theater and dining establishment in northeast Portland, Oregon. The facility is operated by the McMenamins chain. The hotel has 35 guestrooms, a brewery, four bars, and a restaurant.

History
The school was built in 1915. The land for the school was sold by John Daniel Kennedy to the Portland School District in 1913.

Currently
By the 1990s, the school had been abandoned. McMenamins, the Portland-based hotel and pub group, bought the old building and funded a full renovation. Today, the Kennedy School functions as an event space with 57 classroom-turned-guestrooms with original chalkboards included. The old cafeteria has been converted into a courtyard restaurant, and the common areas now include a bar, gift shop, movie theater, brewery, and soaking tub.

Kennedy School won in the "Best Date Bar" category of Willamette Week "Best of Portland Readers' Poll 2020".

See also
 National Register of Historic Places listings in Northeast Portland, Oregon

References

External links

 Kennedy School at McMenamins.com

1915 establishments in Oregon
Cinemas and movie theaters in Oregon
Concordia, Portland, Oregon
Education in Portland, Oregon
Hotels in Portland, Oregon
McMenamins
National Register of Historic Places in Portland, Oregon
Portland Historic Landmarks
Renaissance Revival architecture in Oregon
Restaurants in Portland, Oregon
School buildings completed in 1915
School buildings on the National Register of Historic Places in Oregon
Theatres in Portland, Oregon